José Rojí Blanco is a Spanish coxswain. He won a gold medal at the 1983 World Rowing Championships in Duisburg with the lightweight men's eight.

References

Year of birth missing (living people)
Spanish male rowers
World Rowing Championships medalists for Spain
Coxswains (rowing)
Living people
20th-century Spanish people